Joanna Wróblewska (born 27 December 1995) is a Polish footballer who can play in as a midfielder. She currently plays for Śląsk Wrocław and has represented the Poland women's national team.

References

1995 births
Living people
Polish women's footballers
Women's association football defenders
Poland women's international footballers